Bala Bisheh Sar (also Romanized as Bālā Bīsheh Sar; also known as Bīsheh Sar Bālā) is a village in Feyziyeh Rural District, in the Central District of Babol County, Mazandaran Province, Iran. At the 2006 census, its population was 807, in 208 families.

References 

Populated places in Babol County